Lacha in geography may refer to:
Łacha, Podlaskie Voivodeship
Łacha, Masovian Voivodeship
Lake Lacha in Russia

It may also refer to:
Lacha, a Basque sheep breed.